Augmented World Expo is the biggest conference and expo for people involved in augmented reality, virtual reality and wearable technology.
It is organized by a non-profit organization named AugmentedReality.Org, with the mission of "Advancing augmented reality to advance humanity".
They produce the events in USA, Europe and Asia, counting with the participation of numerous technology companies, such as Google or Intel and several relevant speakers in the field.

Events

USA events 
 AWE 2019 – Santa Clara, California, 10th anniversary 
 AWE 2018 – Santa Clara, California, USA
 AWE 2017 – Santa Clara, California, USA
 AWE 2016
 AWE 2015
 AWE 2014
 AWE 2013

EU events 
 AWE EU 2018 – Munich, Germany
 AWE EU 2017 – Munich, Germany
 AWE EU 2016

Israel events 
 AWE Israel 2018 – Tel Aviv, Israel

Asia events 
 AWE Asia 2016

References 

Augmented reality
Technology conferences
Business conferences